The National Organization for the Professional Advancement of Black Chemists and Chemical Engineers or NOBCChE (pronounced No-be-shay) is a nonprofit, professional organization. NOBCChE's goal is to increase the number of minorities in science, technology, and engineering fields.  The organization accomplishes this by creating bonds with professionals working at science-related companies and faculty at local school districts in order to get more minorities to pursue a career in science and engineering fields.  NOBCChE focuses on establishing diversity programs for the professional development of young kids and to spread knowledge in science and engineering.  NOBCChE chapters can be found nationwide.

History 
NOBCChE was co-founded in 1972 by a group of chemists and chemical engineers.  Initially, the organization was financially aided by the Haas Community Fund and Drexel University.  After receiving positive feedback and interest from other black chemists and chemical engineers, the founders decided to expand on their idea and set up a structured idea of what they wanted the society to emphasize.  Two years later, the first national meeting was held in New Orleans, LA.  At the conference, black chemists and chemical engineers found that they could discuss career-related issues with others who were in similar fields.  Today, the national conference features various workshops, research presentations, and high school science bowls. NOBCChE also presents the Percy L. Julian Award, given to African-American scientists who have made significant contributions to the areas of pure or applied research in science or engineering.

Founders of NOBCChE
Dr. Joseph N. Cannon, Chemical Engineer, Prof. - Howard University
Dr. Lloyd Ferguson, Chemist, Prof. - California State University
Dr. William M. Jackson, Chemist, Prof. - Howard University
Dr. William Guillory, Chemist, Prof. - Drexel University
Dr. Henry C. McBay, Chemist, Prof. - Morehouse College
Dr. Charles Merideth, Chemist, Chancellor, The Atlanta University Center, Inc.
Dr. James Porter, Chemical Engineer, Prof. - MIT

Presidents 
The President has the overall responsibility for affecting the objectives of NOBCChE, oversees the day-to-day activities of the organization, and is the official representative of the organization. For over 45 years, talented, dedicated, and passionate professionals from industry, academia, and government have volunteered their time to lead the organization and advance the mission of creating an eminent cadre of people of color in STEM. Each NOBCChE President develops his or her own set goals with corresponding initiatives and events.

*Affiliation at the time of election

References

External links 
 NOBCChE Welcome to NOBCChE
 NOBCChE Midwest Regional Homepage
 National Society of Black Engineers (NSBE)
 History

Chemistry societies
African-American professional organizations